Armina gilchristi is a species of sea slug, a nudibranch, a marine gastropod mollusk in the family Arminidae.

Description
This species has a dark, grey and black mantle with longitudinal white, granulose ridges.

Distribution
Armina gilchristi is endemic to the waters off Southern Africa.

References

Arminidae
Gastropods described in 1955